The women's 4 × 100 metres relay event at the 2019 Summer Universiade was held on 12 and 13 July at the Stadio San Paolo in Naples.

Medalists

*Athletes who competed in heats only

Results

Heats
Qualification: First 3 teams in each heat (Q) and the next 2 fastest (q) qualified for the final.

Final

References

Relay
2019